Blicks River, a perennial stream that is part of the Clarence River catchment, is located in the Northern Tablelands district of New South Wales, Australia.

Course and features
Blicks River is formed through the confluence of Majors Creek and Little Falls Creek, below Majors Point, within the Great Dividing Range, northeast of the village of Ebor. The river flows generally north, east by north, and then east, reaching its confluence with the Nymboida River, north of Dorrigo. The river descends  over its  course.

See also

 Rivers of New South Wales

References

 

Rivers of New South Wales
Northern Tablelands